Melena del Sur Municipal Museum is a museum located in the 26th street in Melena del Sur, Cuba. It was established on 16 February 1982.

The museum holds collections on history and weaponry.

See also 
 List of museums in Cuba

References 

Museums in Cuba
Buildings and structures in Mayabeque Province
Museums established in 1982
1982 establishments in Cuba
20th-century architecture in Cuba